Melbourne City Football Club Youth is the youth system of Melbourne City Football Club based in Cranbourne East, Melbourne. The youth team plays in the NPL Victoria 2, the second tier of Victorian football in Australia and the hiatus A-League Youth competition. The club also fields under-21s, under-18s, and three other academy teams within the NPL Victoria system.

History

Early years (2011–2014)
The team was founded in 2011 as Melbourne Heart Youth, the season after their senior side Melbourne City (then known as Melbourne Heart FC), made their A-League debut. The inaugural manager was John Aloisi before he accepted the role as head manager at the end of the 2011–12 season. From 2012 onwards, Joe Palatsides had been the manager. The youth team's first match was played in the 2011–12 against local rivals Melbourne Victory in a 2–0 win at John Cain Memorial Park.

Entry into National Premier Leagues (2014–2018)
On 7 November 2014, it was confirmed that Melbourne City would compete in the NPL Victoria 1 competition from the 2015 season onwards. The team consists mainly of Melbourne City's youth team, which also competes in the A-League Youth. On top of this, Melbourne City opted to send a U-20 team to enter the concurrently-run development-level U-20 NPL league competition.

The team finished on top of the table of the 2014–15 National Youth League, tied with Brisbane Roar FC Youth on both points and goal difference but were awarded the title having scored a greater number of goals.

After several seasons competing in the NPL, Melbourne City announced they were expanding their participation to also enter teams into the U-18 and U-15 competitions, with the U-18 side notably being managed by former manager John van 't Schip's brother Davey. In February 2018, the two new youth teams had joined the National Premier Leagues for the under-20s and under-18s side.

Players

Youth current squad
These players can also play with the senior squad and compete in the A-League Youth and the NPL Victoria 2.

Under-21s current squad

Under-18s current squad

Current staff

Head Coaches:

Staff:

Honours
 Youth (Under-23s)
 A-League Youth Premiership
 Winners (2): 2016–17, 2017–18
 Runners-up (1): 2018–19

 A-League Youth Championship
 Winners (2): 2014–15, 2017
 Runners-up (1): 2018

 National Premier Leagues Victoria 3
 Runners-up (1): 2022

 Under-21s
 National Premier Leagues Victoria 2 U-21 Championship
 Winners (4): 2015, 2016, 2017, 2019
 Runners-up (2): 2018, 2022

 National Premier Leagues Victoria 3 U-21 Premiership
 Runners-up (1): 2022

 National Premier Leagues Victoria 3 U-21 Championship
 Winners (1): 2022

 Under-18s
 National Premier Leagues Victoria U-18
 Winners (1): 2022
 Runners-up (2): 2018, 2019

Stadium
The team hosts its home matches at CB Smith Reserve. In previous years, home games have also been played at Epping Stadium, John Cain Memorial Reserve, John Ilhan Memorial Reserve and La Trobe University.

Seasons

See also
 Melbourne City FC
 Melbourne City FC (W-League)

References

External links
 Official website

Melbourne City FC
Soccer clubs in Melbourne
Association football clubs established in 2008
2008 establishments in Australia
A-League National Youth League